Araceli, officially the Municipality of Araceli,  is a 4th class municipality in the province of Palawan, Philippines. According to the 2020 census, it has a population of 14,434 people.

The municipality covers roughly the northern half of Dumaran Island. Cuyono is the principal language of the area.

Araceli was formerly part of Dumaran Municipality, but was made into a separate municipality in 1961. The Catholic Parish is Nuestra Sra. de Araceli, that can be translated to "Altar of the Sky" (from ara, meaning altar; and celi, meaning sky).

Geography

Barangays
Araceli is politically subdivided into 13 barangays.
 Tinintinan
 Dalayawan
 San Jose De Oro
 Talotogs
 Santo Niño/Santo papa
 Balogo
 Lumacadlacad
 Mauringuen
 Madoldolon
 Osmeña
 Dagman
 Calandagan (formerly Tudela)
 Poblacion

Climate

Demographics

Economy

References

External links
Araceli Profile at PhilAtlas.com
[ Philippine Standard Geographic Code]
Philippine Census Information
Local Governance Performance Management System

Municipalities of Palawan